Philip John Ragazzo (June 24, 1915 – October 3, 1994) was an American football lineman who played in the National Football League (NFL) for the Cleveland Rams, the Philadelphia Eagles, and the New York Giants.  He played college football at Western Reserve University (now known as Case Western Reserve University) and was drafted in the eighth round of the 1938 NFL Draft by the Green Bay Packers.  A graduate of Niles High, he was a three-year letterman for the Red Dragons, graduating in 1934. He was an all- county and All-Ohio selection during a storied scholastic career, playing collegiately for Western Reserve from 1934 to 1937 where he earned All-American honors as a lineman. Considered one of the toughest at his position during his era, he played seven seasons in the National Football League, starting first with the Cleveland Rams (1938–1940) and then moving over to the Philadelphia Eagles (1940–1941) after being traded by the Rams. His play was interrupted by World War II, but he returned to the NFL as a member of the New York Giants where he played from 1945 to 1947. After football, he became a history teacher at Niles McKinley Hs where he taught until his retirement. He died in Niles, Ohio of natural causes, October 3, 1994 at age 79.

References

1915 births
1994 deaths
American football guards
American football tackles
Bainbridge Commodores football players
Case Western Spartans football players
Cleveland Rams players
New York Giants players
Philadelphia Eagles players
People from Niles, Ohio
Players of American football from Ohio